The German National Cyclo-cross Championships are held annually to decide the cycling champions in the cyclo-cross discipline, across various categories.

Men

Elite

Under-23

Junior
 1991 : Christian Müller
 1996 : Karsten Worner
 1997 : Torsten Hiekmann
 1998 : Tilo Schüler
 1999 : Hannes Genze
 2000 : Sven Haussler
 2001 : Thorsten Struch
 2002 : Felix Gniot
 2003 : Benjamin Hill
 2004 : Paul Voß
 2005 : Philipp Walsleben
 2007 : Ole Quast
 2008 : Fabian Danner
 2009 : Michael Schweizer
 2010 : Jannick Geisler
 2011 : Silvio Herklotz
 2012 : Silvio Herklotz
 2013 : Marco König
 2014 : Ludwig Cords
 2015 : Ludwig Cords
 2016 : Maximilian Möbis
 2017 : Niklas Märkl
 2018 : Tom Lindner
 2019 : Tom Lindner
 2020 : Marco Brenner
 2021 : Fabian Eder
 2022 : Silas Kuschla

Women

Elite

Under-23

Junior

See also
German National Road Race Championships
German National Time Trial Championships
German National Mountain Bike Championships

References

Cycle races in Germany
Recurring sporting events established in 1954
1954 establishments in Germany
National cyclo-cross championships